Madathil is an Arabic and Indian surname. Notable people with the surname include:

Kumaran Madathil (1920–1995), Indian politician
Sajitha Madathil, Indian actress
Venugopal Madathil (born 1966), Indian cinematographer

Arabic-language surnames
Indian surnames